Dumpu is a village in the upper Ramu Valley in Usino Rural LLG, Madang Province, Papua New Guinea. The village was serviced by Dumpu Airport. During World War II the village became the divisional headquarters of the Australian 11th Division.

The Dumpu or Watiwa language is spoken in the village.

Populated places in Madang Province